The American Press Association is a self-regulated non-governmental news press organization that is considered the oldest news press agency in the United States.

History
In 1882, the American Press Association was founded in Chicago by Maj. Orlando J. Smith, a Civil War veteran and American philosopher and former editor of the Terre Haute Mail, the owner and editor of the Terre Haute Express which he moved to Chicago in 1878 and renamed the Chicago Express. Shortly after its founding, the Association relocated to New York City, with offices at 32 Vesey Street. In 1891, Smith began syndicating humorist Edgar Wilson Nye's work, leading him to become the "most widely read and highly paid writer in the United States" at the time of Nye's death in 1896. At the time of his death in 1908, the Association was "the largest newspaper syndicate in the United States." Smith's son, Courtland Smith, succeeded him as president of the organization. In February 1909, Dr. Albert Shaw wrote about Smith and the American Press Association in The American Review of Reviews stating:

"The greatest single educational influence of the United States is the country newspaper. And more than other man Major Smith made it possible for country newspapers to provide their readers with a fresh and accurate statement of the news of the world at large, of the country as a whole, and of their State or section, while also enabling them to keep abreast of progress in science, art, literature, and all things humanizing and progressive. He perceived with great clearness the opportunity for cooperative effort in the careful editing and economical production of newspapers: and he was able to give effect to his ideas so successfully as to have made him one of the great leaders in the fireside education of the masses of the plain people of America, most of whom still live in villages or upon farms."

In 1911, the Association took out a long-term lease on a new a 150-foot, 12-story Neo-Classical office building at 225 West 39th Street. The building, which cost $300,000, was designed by Mulliken & Moeller and built for the Land and Realty Company to replace "the vacant building of the old Second Reformed Presbyterian church, at 225 West Thirty-ninth street, adjoining the Roman Catholic Orphan Asylum", and thereafter became known as the American Press Association Building.

See also
Inter-American Press Association

References
Notes

Sources

External links
Official website

Organizations established in 1882
International journalism organizations
Freedom of expression organizations
American journalism organizations
1882 establishments in the United States